Philippine mythology is the body of stories and epics originating from, and part of, the indigenous Philippine folk religions, which include various ethnic faiths distinct from one another. Philippine mythology is incorporated from various sources, having similarities with Indonesian and Malay myths, as well as Hindu, Muslim, Shinto, Buddhist, and Christian traditions, such as the notion of heaven (kaluwalhatian, kalangitan, kamurawayan, etc.), hell (kasamaan, sulad, etc.), and the human soul (kaluluwa, kaulolan, makatu, ginokud, etc.). Philippine mythology attempts to explain the nature of the world through the lives and actions of heroes, deities (referred to as anito or diwata in some ethnic groups), and mythological creatures. The majority of these myths were passed on through oral tradition, and preserved through the aid of community spiritual leaders or shamans (babaylan, katalonan, mumbaki, baglan, machanitu, walian, mangubat, bahasa, etc.) and community elders.

The mythologies and indigenous religions of the Philippines have historically been referred to as Anito or Anitism, meaning "ancestral religion". Other terms used were Anitismo, a Hispano-Filipino translation, and Anitería, a derogatory version used by most members of the Spanish clergy. Today, many ethnic peoples continue to practice and conserve their unique indigenous religions, notably in ancestral domains, although foreign and foreign-inspired religions continue to influence their life-ways through conversions, inter-marriage, and land-buying. A number of scholarly works have been devoted to Anito and its various aspects, although many of its stories and traditions have yet to be recorded by specialists in the fields of anthropology and folklore.

Sources 

There are two significant sources of Philippine mythologies, namely, oral literature and written literature.

Oral (folk) literature
Oral literature (also known as folk literature) consists of stories that have been or still are being passed down from one generation to another through oral means such as verbal communication. All sources of Philippine mythologies are originally oral literature. As oral literature is passed on verbally, changes in stories and the addition of stories with the passing of time are natural phenomena and part of the evolving dynamism of Philippine mythology. Despite many attempts to record all of the oral literature of the Philippines, the majority of the stories pertaining to Philippine mythologies have yet to be properly documented. These oral traditions were intentionally interfered with by the Spanish through the introduction of Christian mythologies in the 16th century. Some examples of such interference are the Biag ni Lam-ang and the Tale of Bernardo Carpio, where the names of certain characters were permanently changed into Spanish ones. Resurgent ripples of interest towards oral literature in the Philippines have sprung up since the 21st century due to sudden popular interest among the youth, coupled with various media such as literary works, television, radio, and social media.

Written literature
Literature consists, in part, of oral tradition that has been committed to writing in the form of manuscripts or publications. Juan de Plasencia wrote the Relacion de las Costumbres de Los Tagalos in 1589, documenting the traditions of the Tagalog people at the time. Other accounts during the period are Miguel de Loarca's Relacion de las Yslas Filipinas and Pedro Chirino's Relacion de las Yslas Filipinas (1604). Various books regarding Anitism have been published by numerous universities throughout the country, such as Mindanao State University, University of San Carlos, University of the Philippines, Ateneo Universities, Silliman University, and University of the Cordilleras, as well as respected non-university publishing houses such as Anvil Publishing. The publication of these books range from the 16th century to the 21st century. There are also printed but unpublished sources of Philippine mythologies, notably college and graduate school theses. Specific written literature should not be used as a generalizing asset of a particular story, as stories differ from town to town or village to village, despite the people of a particular area belonging to the same ethnic group. Some examples are the story of Bakunawa and the Seven Moons and the story of The Tambanokano, which have multiple versions depending on the locality, people's ethnicity, origin of story, and cultural progression.

History 

The indigenous religions of the Philippines developed through a variety of migration phases and trade routes. Scholars theorized that Austronesians arrived through the "Out-of-Taiwan model", where Homo sapiens from mainland Asia crossed Taiwan, and later the Philippines, until furthering to other islands south of the Philippines. The Austronesians are believed to have brought complex animist beliefs with shamanism, ancestor worship, totemism, and tattoo artistry. The beliefs on benevolent and malevolent spirits was also established by their arrival.

By 200 to 300 CE, Hindu mythologies arrived in some areas in the Philippines through trade routes and more waves of ethnic migrations. Hinduism brought in Indianized traditions to the Philippines, including indigenous epics such as Ibalong, Siday, and Hinilawod, folk stories, and a variety of superstitions which gradually established more complex indigenous polytheistic religions. Additionally, the concept of good and bad demons, which is prevalent in Indian societies, became widespread in the archipelago. These demons were viewed as both evil and good, unlike Western demons which are only evil. Unlike other areas in Southeast Asia which were heavily converted to Hinduism, indigenous religions in the Philippines were not replaced by Hinduism, rather, those religions absorbed traditions and beliefs present in Hinduism. Gender-variant deities and shamans also became widespread during this period. Humanoid mythical creatures also developed alongside a variety of evolving belief systems. Around 900 CE, Chinese influence spread in some areas in the Philippines, inputting Sinified belief systems in the process, along with Buddhist mythologies. The most prominent belief that spread during this phase was the belief in ghosts, which is prevalent in Chinese societies.

By 1300 CE, Muslim traders arrived in the southern Philippines, bringing with them Islamic mythologies and its belief systems. Many natives in certain areas in the southern and western Philippines were converted to Islam easily as much of the people had societies that had high acceptance towards foreign traditions. In the middle of the 16th century, the Spanish arrived from Latin America and brought with them Christian mythologies of the Ibero-American kind (For example, veneration to Our Lady of Guadalupe of Mexico) and its accompanying belief systems. Some of the inhabitants were receptive to these myths, but most of which were against it as the Spanish wanted to conquer the lands and override their leaders, instead of simple tradition exchanges. When the Spanish laid its foundations in the archipelago, a three-century purge against indigenous religions began, which resulted in much of the ethnic people's indigenous cultures and traditions being brutalized and mocked. The phase also replaced much of the polytheistic beliefs of the people into monotheism. Existing myths and folklores were retrofitted to the tastes of the Spanish, but many indigenous belief systems were hard to replace, and thus, were retained despite Spanish threats and killings. During the Philippine revolution, there were attempts to revitalize the indigenous Philippine folk religions and make them the newly established state's national religion. However, the proposals were sideline due to conflicts with the Americans, which led to war. In the late 19th century, the Americans occupied the country and bolstered Westernization which included the conversion of more people into Christianity.

Regional Philippine mythology
Due to intensive cultural exchanges spanning millennia, many of the mythologies from a variety of ethnic groups in the Philippines have similarities, in one way or another. A few examples are:
 the creation myths of the Bicolano people and the Visayan peoples, whose deities' names are different but the activities recorded in their creation myths are extremely similar;
 the presence of deities named Mayari/Malayari/Apûng Malyari, which is prevalent in Tagalog, Kapampangan, and Sambal mythologies;
 the presence of moon deities, named Bulan in Hiligaynon, Karay-a, Cebuano and Bicolano mythologies, and serpent deities named Bakunawa in Hiligaynon, Karay-a, Cebuano, and Bicolano mythologies;
 the presence of moon-swallowing monsters named Tambanokano in Mandaya and Manobo mythologies, where the Mandaya Tambanokano is depicted as a crab, while the Manobo Tambanokano is depicted as a tarantula or scorpion, depending on the ethnic sub-group;
 the presence of foe-deities named Gugurang and Asuang in Bicolano mythology and Agurang and Aswang in Hiligaynon mythology; and 
 the presence of deities named Kabunian in the mythologies of the Ibaloi people, the Bontoc people, and the Ifugao people.

Despite being ethnic counterparts, the deities, heroes, and creatures are completely different from each other, and their stories must be respected as they are and not mixed into a single narrative. It should also be noted that each ethnic story has a variety of versions. In many cases, stories vary between town to town or village to village despite the peoples in the specified areas belonging to the same ethnic group.

The Philippines is made up of more than 7,000 islands, but they are divided into three main island regions. These regions are: Luzon, Visayas, and Mindanao (which is subdivided here into North and South). There have been attempts to refer each region to specific pre-colonial mythologies, however, the difference in mythologies and belief systems is not by region, but by ethnic groups, where some ethnic groups have influence in only a few towns, while others have inter-regional influences spanning various provinces. Buddhism and Hinduism in the Philippines is influential to the culture and myths of the people within the three major island regions. There is no unified mythology among the three regions, due to a wide array of diverse cultures that continue to flourish distinctly in the islands. These myths were orally passed down, which means that even myths within the same region will have some degree of change.

Luzon 
Pre-colonial Luzon was split among Hindu-Buddhist, Muslim principalities, and animist worshippers.
 Creation Story – Story of Bathala (Tagalog)
 The story of Bathala explains how he became the ruler of the universe, the etiological explanation of the coconut tree, and how everything on earth came to be
 The Creation – Lumawig (Igorot)
 Lumawig, a great spirit god created people in different areas. This gives an explanation on why people speak differently than others.
 The Flood Story (Igorot)
 Lumawig's two sons decided to flood the earth to bring up mountains so that they can catch pig and deer. However, in the acts of doing this, they drowned all the people on earth except for two people; they were brother and sister. Lumawig helped the two survive the flood and after the flood subsided, the brother and sister got married and repopulated the earth.
 Etiological explanation for mountains

Visayas 
Pre-colonial Visayas were influenced by Hindu-Buddhist and Animism. The Spaniards even described some of the indigenous people who lived there as Pintados, which means that they had tattoos/paintings on them.
 The Sun and the Moon
 The sun and moon created the stars. This provides an etiological explanation for the stars.
 The sun burned the stars and this made the moon upset. They begin to fight, but the moon ran away. This provides an etiological explanation why the sun and moon seem to be "chasing" each other.

Mindanao 
Pre-colonial Mindanao (around 900AD) were influenced by Hindu-Buddhist, Indonesian, and Malaysian beliefs and culture. Then around the 14th century, Islam in most northern islands of Mindanao were well established.

 The Children of the Limokon (Mandaya)
 The limokon bird laid eggs along a river that created man and woman. However, they were born on separate sides of the river. One day the man came across the woman and they got married and had children.
 This gives an explanation on how the Mandaya people were created.

 The Sun and the Moon (Mandaya)
 The sun and moon were married, but one day, the sun got angry at the moon and started to chase her. This gives an etiological explanation why the sun and moon "chase" each other.
 The first child of the sun and moon  was chopped up by the sun because he was angry at him. The sun then scattered him across the sky. This is the etiological explanation why there are stars.
 Another son of the sun and moon was a gigantic crab that created lightning when he blinks his eyes. He lives in a hole in the bottom of the ocean and is responsible for high and low tides.
 How the Moon and the Stars Came to Be (Bukidnon)
 This was a time the sky was close to the ground. A spinster who was pounding rice struck the sky so hard it began to rise. Her comb and beads that she hung on the sky to dry also raised with it. That became the moon and stars.
 The Flood Story (Bukidnon)
 A big crab that crawled into the sea created the flood in which drowned all the people except those who made a raft and stayed upon it.
 Origin (Bagobo)
 A boy and a girl were the only ones left on Mount Apo. They were so weak because of the drought. However, the boy found a sugarcane and was able to cut it. Water from the sugar cane refreshed him and his sister until rain came.
 This is why they are called Bagobo.
 Epic ‘Tudbulul’ (T’Boli)
 Tudbulu was a hero that organized a concert. He gathered music and this attracted many people. Some of these people stayed and lived together.
 This is how the T’boli tribe was formed
 Creation Story – D’wata (T’Boli)
 The Betoti found soil and brought it back to D’wata. They spread out the soil and created dry land. The animals on earth then told Betoti that they need someone to look after them. Betoti told D’wata and thus man and woman were created out of statues.
 Creation Story – Melu (B’laan)
 Melu created the Earth with his dead skin that came off as he cleaned himself. The remaining dead skin was used to make 2 men. However, Melu could not make their noses. Tau Tana appeared below the earth and helped him make the noses. When they were done, they whipped the men until they started to move. Melu then told the two men to save their dead skin and hair so that he would be able to make them companions.
 In the Beginning (B’laan)
 Four beings that created the earth, and people.
 They tried using wax, then dirt. However, their noses were the most difficult to make. Melu  was in a hurry and pressed his finger at the root of their noses. This is the reason why the B’laan peoples’ noses are the way it is.

Cosmogony or creation myths 

Cosmogony or creation myths usually tell how the world was created, and most of the time, also includes how mankind came into existence. Each ethnic group in the Philippines has their own creation myth, making the myths on creation in the Philippines extremely diverse. In some cases, a single ethnic group has multiple versions of their creation myth, depending on locality and sub-culture from a larger 'mother' culture. A few of the many cosmogonies known to specific ethnic groups in the Philippines are as follow:
 Ifugao – the universe has always existed and will always exist
 Tagalog – a sacred kite caused the sky and the sea to war; the sky threw boulders onto the sea, forming islands; the kite afterwards built a nest on an island and left the sky and sea in peace
 Bicolano – the only thing that existed in the universe were water and sky; the grandsons of the sky god, Languit, sought to attack the sky realm to have more power; the group was led by Daga, god who controlled winds; Languit, in anger due to his grandchildren's betrayal, struck all of them with lightning, killing them instantly; Bitoon, who did not join the upheaval, looked for her brothers, but was also accidentally struck by Languit's lightning; only the sea god, Tubigan, managed to calm down Languit; the two old gods each gave the bodies of their dead grandchildren light, where Bulan's body became the moon, Aldao's (or Adlao) body became the sun, and Bitoon's body became the stars; Daga's body was not given light and, thus, became the earth
 Kapampangan – the sky, earth, planets, and stars were in existence before land came; during a war between the deities for the beautiful daughter of the supreme deity, Mangetchay, the earth was formed from the stones thrown by the warring deities; life on earth was created by Mangetchay in remembrance of the deity's dearest daughter who died in war
 Ilokano – the Ilokano supreme deity ordered two primordial giants, Angalo and Aran, to become responsible for the creation of the world; the giant Anglao (or Angalo) dug the earth and made mountains; Anglao urinated into holes in the earth and made the rivers and seas, afterwards he put up the sky, the sun, the moon, and arranged the stars
 Ibaloi – the first thing in existence were the skyworld and the underworld; the peoples of both sides fought and one day, a man from the underworld hit the sun god with an arrow; the sun god afterwards pushed up the skyworld and pushed down the underworld, and then created the earth
 Panay – for the many ethnic groups originating from Panay, the world was said to be formless and shapeless in the old times; the sea, sky, and earth were mixed together; from the formless mist, the deities Tungkung Langit and Alunsina appeared; the two married each other and lived in the highest realm of eternal space; one day, Tungkung Langit fought and hurt Alunsina, which forced Alunsina to be driven away; in Tungkung Langit's loneliness, he created the sea and land and took his wife's jewels to create the stars, moon, and sun; despite all of these, Alunsina chose to stay free from anybody and never returned to Tungkung Langit, thus, an early notion of divorce
 Bisaya – one Bisaya cosmogony myth tells that a sacred bird of prey incited the sky and the sea to fight against each other so that it may find somewhere to land, thus creating the islands where the bird of prey landed on; another Bisaya cosmogony myth tells that the deities Kaptan and Magauayan (or Maguayan) fought each other for eons until, tired of the war, the great bird Manaul dropped boulders upon the fighting divinities; the rocks that dropped became islands while another Bisaya cosmogony myth tells Kaptan's son, Lihangin, who was god of the wind, and Maguayan's daughter, Lidagat, goddess of the sea, were married and produced children; three of these deities, led by Likalibutan, made an upheaval against Kaptan, angering the supreme god; Lisuga, who was looking for her brothers, was also accidentally hit by Kaptan; all the four grandchildren of Kaptan and Maguayan perished; Kaptan accused Maguayan of the coup, but was later calmed down and the two deities grieved their grandchildren; Liadlao's body became the sun, Libulan's body became the moon, Lisuga's body became the stars, and the wicked Likalibutan's body became the earth and had no light; soon, a bamboo tree grew, where the first man, Sikalak, and the first woman, Sikabay, sprang from
 Suludnon – there was no land in the beginning; only the sky and a wide expanse of water called Linaw were present; the primordial giants, Laki and Bayi, appeared from nowhere and were responsible for the creation of many things; Bayi, the creation giantess, caught the primordial earthworm which excreted the earth; she also have birth to the wild animals that inhabit the earth
 Bukidnon – in one Bukidnon cosmogony myth, the supreme god Magbabaya created the earth after he saw that there was only a hole, no sky and soil; he first made the eight elements, tumbaga (bronze), bulawan (gold), salapi (coins), bato (rocks), Gabon (clouds), ulan (rain), puthaw (iron), and tubig (water); from the elements, he created the sea, sky, the moon, and the stars; in another Bukidnon cosmogony myth, Magbabaya (referred as Diwata na Magbabaya) created the world with the god Dadanhayan ha Sugay; before creating mankind, the two deities created the Incantus, six guardian deities that contain good and evil qualities and can send calamities if angered
 Manobo – creations myths by the Manobo is diverse; one Manobo cosmogony myth from Talakogan in the Agusan valley tells that the creation of the world was due to the god, Makalindung, who set up the world on iron posts; another Manobo cosmogony myth from Argawan and Hibung rivers states that the creation goddess, Dagau, created the world; while another Manobo cosmogony myth from the upper Agusan says that the world is shaped like a giant mushroom and deities shake its core when angered by humans
 Manuvu – in the beginning, there was nothing but a formless void; the deity Manama or Sigalungan created the deities which assisted him in creation; he took two steel bars and fashioned the bars into a frame; he then scraped off his fingernails and molded it into a mass which eventually became the earth
 Bagobo – the world was created by Pamulak Manobo, who made the land and sea and the first humans; rain is caused when he throws water from the sky, where showers are his spit; white clouds are smoke from the fire of the deities; the sun created yellow clouds that make the colors of the rainbow
 Blaan – the god Melu constantly rubbed his skin so that he may be pure white; he later accumulated a lot of dead skin, and in his annoyance, he used the dead skin to create the earth
 Teduray – in the beginning, there was only sky and sea; Sualla (or Tullus-God) lived in the sky, while his sister Sinonggol lived in Bonggo, the land of the dead; Sualla visited the palace of the sun and touched one of the eight primordial wooden khnenentaos (statues), thus creating the first Teduray; from the rib of the man, Sualla created the first woman; when the man and woman had a child named Mentalalan, it became sick and the man sought Sualla's aid; Sualla gave a special medicine to the man, but before the man delivered the medicine to his son, a demon sent by Singgol, changed the medicine, which led to the death of Mentalalan; Sualla afterwards convened a meeting with his four brothers, Mentail, Micael, Mintlafis, and Osman Ali to buy soil from the Navi; the soil was then planted by Sualla at Colina, the center of the world; the soil grew, and Mentalalan was finally buried; from the boy's body, crops of different kinds sprouted; in anger, Sinonggol threw her comb, which turned into the first boar that aimed to destroy the crops

Concept of realms 
Like most mythologies (or religions) in the world, the concept of realms focuses greatly on heaven, earth, and hell. These worldwide concepts are also present in the many mythologies of the Philippines, although there are stark differences between ethnic groups, with ethnic-endemic additions, subtractions, and complexities in the beliefs of ethnic realms. Additionally, unlike the general Western concept of heaven and hell, in the Philippine concept, heaven may be located in the underworld, while hell may be located in the skyworld, depending on the associated ethnic group. These differences are notably caused by both cultural diffusion and cultural parallelism. These diffusions and parallelisms are also present in the many story motifs of Philippine mythologies. Some examples of the concept of realms in the many ethnic groups in the Philippines are as follow:
Tagalog – the upperworld is called Kaluwalhatian, and is the home of specific deities who belong to the court of Bathala, the Tagalog supreme deity. The middleworld are the domains of mankind, other deities and various mythological races, while in the underworld, there are two realms, namely, Maca (realm where the spirits of good mortals go to) and Kasanaan (realm where the spirits of sinful mortals go to). Deities also dwell in the underworld, notably Sitan and his four agents. There is also Batala, a reappearing mountain realm located in the middleworld and is filled with the sacred ‘’tigmamanukan’’ omen creatures.
Palaw-an – the earthly world is composed of seven plates, one on top of the other with a center pole connecting all of them; mankind is believed to live in the middle of the fourth plate
Tagbanwa – the earthworld and the underworld are complete opposites as night in the earthworld is day in the underworld, and vice versa; rivers flow backward in the underworld, from sea to mountains, and rice is always eaten cold
Batak – the ancestral land of the Batak is called Kabatakan, which is found in the middle layer (fourth layer) of the universe; the universe has seven layers (lukap) consisting of a center tier (fourth layer) surrounded by ocean and inhabited by humans, animals, plants, super-human beings, and aggressive entities; Puyok, the highest sacred mountain in Kabatakan, is regarded as the original place of all malevolent panya’en; the Gunay Gunay, at the edge of the universe, is perceived as the place of origin of the couple divinities, Baybay (goddess and master of rice) and Ungaw (god and master of bees).
Sulodnon – the universe has three realms; the upperworld is Ibabawnon, which is divided into two realms, one for the male deities and the other for female deities; the middleworld is Pagtung-an, where the earth is located; the lowerworld is Idadalmunon, where the souls of the dead go to; initially, there was no land, only a sky and an expanse of water called Linaw; earth was established upon the excretion of an earthworm found by Bayi, a creation giantess
Bisaya – the universe has seven layers; the first is uninhabited and nothing can be found in its vastness; the second is called Tibugnon and is made of water filled with mermaids and sea fairies who govern their separate kingdoms; the third layer is called Idalmunon which is the bowels of the earth and is inhabited by underground spirits; the fourth layer is called Lupan-on which is the earth where mankind and various supernatural beings live in; the fifth layer is called Kahanginan which is the atmosphere directly above earth and is the home of flying beings such as the bentohangin race and the hubot race; the sixth layer is called Ibabaw-non-which is inhabited by special babaylans who intercede for man with spirits; the last layer and the highest is called Langit-non, which is the abode of Maka-ako, the creator of the Bisaya universe; these seven layers can be classified into three categories, namely Kahilwayan, the skyworld realms ruled by Kaptan and inhabited by deities who assist him, Kamaritaan, the middleworld home of humans which is ruled by Sidapa and Makaptan and inhabited by the gods of their middleworld court, and lastly, Kasakitan, the lowerworld realms ruled by Magyan and Sumpoy; Kasakitan is said to have a unique sub-realm called Kanitu-nituhan which is ruled by the god Sisiburanen
Bicolano – it is believed that the sky and the waters are the first thing in existence; after the divine upheaval against the god Languit, the sun, moon, stars, and earth were formed through the bodies of his dead grandchildren; an unnamed giant is said to support the world, where his finger movements caused earthquakes; if the giant's body moves, it is said to cause the end of the world
Ilokano – the sky, sun, moon, stars, rivers, seas, and mountains are said to be created by the giant Anglao upon the order of an unnamed supreme deity; the underworld is guarded by the giant dog, Lobo
Kapampangan – the sky, earth, planets, and stars were in existence while land was created after the great divine war of the gods which was caused by the beauty of the divine daughter of Mangechay, the Kapampangan supreme deity; the gods lived in different faraway planets, and they travelled from planet to planet, with each travel taking up to hundreds of years
Ifugao – initially, it is believed that there are two mythical worlds, namely Daya and Lagud. Daya is the downstream east, while Lagud is the upstream west. This notion later developed into a layered concept of the universe, where Daya became the upperworld which includes four layers, namely, Hudog, Luktag, Hubulan, and Kabunian, where Kabunian is the lowest of the upperworld, and is home to the god Liddum, the only deity who directly communicated with mankind for the deities of the upper layers of the upperworld. Each realm's upper surface layer is believed to be earthen and filled with fields and gardens, while the lower surface is made of smooth blue stone. The middleworld is the mortal world, directly below the Kabunian layer, and has the broadest circumference in the global universe, as both the upperworld and the lowerworld grow successively smaller as they approach the end of the celestial globe. The lowerworld is called Dalom, which is made of an indeterminate number of layers. The souls of those who were murdered are believed to go to its lowest level. Finally, the realm of Lagud was transformed by the layered universe concept into a far eastern sub-realm region
Kalinga – the universe is believed to look like a big plate (personifies the earth) with a smaller dome (personifies the sky) resting on it; the sky is not transparent, rather it is opaque and solid and its rim is three meters thick
Kankanaey – the middleworld is believed to be carried by four huge posts which stands on the lowerworld; a giant hog causes earthquakes every time it scratches against one of the posts; the lowerworld is called Aduongan and is inhabited by cannibals
Ibaloi – the skyworld and the underworld were once close to each other; this changed after a great war between the two sides where a man from the underworld hit the sun god with an arrow; the sun god moved the two world apart, establishing a gap between; earth as the middleworld was afterwards established
Bukidnon – the Banting is a small circula space of immense brightness extant in the beginning, surrounded by a sacred rainbow; the realm called Haldan ta Paraiso (Garden of Paradise) was created by Diwta na Magbabaya from materials provided by Dadanhayan ha Sugay; the garden is where Agtayuban rests his wings; the upperworld is said to be divided into seven tiers and the underworld also has seven tiers, but only three are identifiable; the middleworld is saucer-shaped, as is the sky, but with the concavity towards the earth
Manobo – the world is on iron posts created by the god Makalindung who lives in the center with a python; the sky is round and ends at the limits of the sea; this limit is the sea navel, where waters ascend and descend; the underworld is below the pillars of the earth and is divided into different subsections where each Manobo nation is assigned a place; there are different sections for other tribes and even for foreign peoples
Mandaya – the earth is flat but pressed into mountains by a mythological woman; the earth rests on the back of a gigantic eel which causes earthquakes when agitated
Bagobo – deities live in the skyworld, where various realms are present, each being ruled by a divinity lesser than the supreme deity Pamulak Manobo; the entrance to the skyworld has numerous kampilan swords who fight without any wielder; the underworld for the sinful dead is called Gimokudan, where spirits with heavy misdeeds are engulfed by flames, while those with little misdeeds are not, although their bodies are covered with sores as they lay in an acid that burns like lemon juice; a special underworld sub-realm called Banua Mebuyan, near a black river, is reserved for children who died at their mother's breast and these souls are nourished by the many-breasted goddess Mebuyan; children's souls who graduate from Banua Mebuyan go to another district to join souls that died of disease; all souls pass through Banua Mebuyan before going to Gimokudan; another special underworld district is dedicated to those slayed by swords or spears, where scars will continue to be with the soul and plants in the district are colored like blood
Tboli – the skyworld has seven layers, where the last layer is the dwelling of the supreme couple deities, Kadaw La Sambad and Bulon La Mogoas; earth was formed due to the body of the sterile god, S’fedat; there are different afterworlds depending on the circumstances of death; the soul of those killed via swords in battle and murder go to Kayong, where the soul is greeted with continual music; if a soul dies a natural death, it goes to Mogul, which has everything a soul desires
Maranao – the world has seven layers; the earth and sky are also divided into seven layers; some of the layers of the earth are the human, layer of karibangs, and the layer under the sea inhabited by nymph-like beings; each sky layer has a door guarded by a garoda; the seventh layer of the sky is heaven, where the tree of life grows and whose leaves inscribes the names of all living humans; once the leaf of a person ripens or dries and falls, the person dies; in a section of heaven, the jars containing the souls of every person alive exists; this jar area is guarded by the fearsome creature Walo
Each ethnic group in the Philippines, which number more than a hundred, has their own indigenous concept of realms. The diversity of ethnic groups in the country contributes to the unique diversity of realms believed to be found endemically in specific ethnic domains and mythologies.

Deities 

Each ethnic group in the country has their own distinct pantheon of deities and belief systems. Some ethnic groups have a supreme deity, while others revere ancestor spirits and/or the spirits of the natural world. The usage of the term "diwata" is mostly found in the central and southern Philippines while the usage of "anito" is found in the northern Philippines. There is also a 'buffer zone' area where both terms are used interchangeably. The etymology of diwata may have been derived from the Sanskrit word, devata, meaning "deity", while anitos etymology may have been derived from the proto-Malayo-Polynesian word qanitu and the proto-Austronesian qanicu, both meaning "ancestral spirits". Both diwata and anito, which are gender-neutral terms, can be translated into deities, ancestral spirits, and/or guardians, depending on the associated ethnic group. The concept of both diwata and anito are similar to the concept of the Japanese kami. However, during the colonization era between the 16th century to the 19th century, the Spanish intentionally modified the meaning of both diwata and anito as both terms were not in line with the monotheistic concept of Christianity. This modification was supported by the Americans in the early 20th century. The meaning of diwata was transformed into "fairy or enchantress", while the meaning of anito was transformed into "ancestors and spirits", although in areas not subjugated by Spain, the original meanings of the two terms were not changed. Each of the supreme deities per ethnic people is completely distinct, even if some of their names are the same or almost the same.

Heroes in Philippine mythology 

Each ethnic group in the Philippines has its own set of stories depicting their mythical heroes, notably through oral traditions such as epics and verbal poems. Many of these stories have now been published in scholarly works and books by various folkloristic and anthropological scholars and researchers throughout the country. Due to Spanish and American colonisation, some of the stories have been retrofitted with minor changes, notably in the heroes' names. For the native people, many of these heroes are referred as actual humans who lived centuries ago (others, a few hundred years ago) and not "mythical" beings, the same way Christians and Muslims believe that their prophets/saints were 'actual' people from the past. Among these heroes are as follow:
 Sondayo – a hero who owns a magical flying scarf called a Monsala, which can be ridden through lightning, in Subanen mythology; he has the power to make anybody fall asleep; his life and epic is much celebrated in the sacred buklog rituals
 Manggob – a young hero raised by a giant recorded in the Diawot epic of Mansaka mythology; he wields a golden top which had the power to bring dreams into reality; his journey focuses on his search for the golden top and his long-lost sister
 Silungan Baltapa – a noble and sinless hero from Sama-Dilaut mythology; his life is mostly about his voyages at sea, noting the tradition of maritime journeys for the Sama (Bajau) peoples; he is believed to have absolute knowledge and possesses power to speed-up time for voyages and essentially go anywhere he pleases
 Tugawasi – a hero who controlled the wind from Labin Agta mythology; his heart beat is said to boom like thunder when he is fighting
 Tud Bulul – a hero famed as the moonspeaker as he can speak with the moon and the wind from T'boli mythology; his weapons are a sword named K'filan, which can stretch to one million lakes and seas, and a shield named K'lung, made out of hardened wood
 Agyu – a powerful hero whose journey is recorded in the Ulaging epic of Talaandig and Manobo mythologies of Bukidnon, while his clan's story is recorded in the Ulangihan epic of Manobo mythology of Livungan Valley; he navigates the sky through his floating ship named Sarimbar/Salimbal
 Laon and Kan – Laon was a king of Negros from Hiligaynon mythology; he owns a head cloth named Birang, which can produce any material or food the wielder wants; Kan was a youthful hero and friend Laon; Together, they slayed a dragon-like monster living in present-day Kanlaon volcano
 Bantugen – his life and journeys are recorded in the Darangen chants, which has been inscribed in the UNESCO Intangible Cultural Heritage Lists, from Maranao mythology; he owns a magic Bangka which can navigate like a submarine and he can also travel the sky, walk on water, and summon ancestral spirits
 Indarapata and Solayman – brothers who have slayed numerous monsters present in Maguindanao mythology and Maranao mythology; they own a sentient kris named Juru Pakal and a sacred plant which notifies Indarapata if Solayman (Solaiman in Maranao) has passed away
 Lumalindaw – a powerful combat musician from Ga'dang mythology; he owns an ayoding, a musical instrument which guides him in making decisions, and a bolo, which produces light and music when swang
 Tuwaang – a craftsman hero from Manobo mythology; he can speak with the wind, ride on lightning, and use a magical flaming skein
 Labaw Dangon, Humadapnon and Dumalapdap – demigod sibling heroes recorded in the Hinilawod/Sugidanon epic from Suludnon mythology; their romantic saga inspired various art forms in Panay
 Ligi Wadagan and Ayo – heroes from the Dulimaman epics of Itneg mythology; Lidi Wadagan, also called Agimlang, is known for his resoluteness in defense of his community, while Ayo, whose full name is "Ayo, si babei nga Dulimaman" and referred simply as Apo, is known for her unsurpassed fistfight combat skills and devotion to protect her family
 Kudaman – a strong hero from Pala'wan mythology; he has the power to revive the dead by spitting them with chewed betel nut; has a purple heron named Linggisan, who he uses for transportation
 Banna – a hero of Dulawon recorded in the Ullalim epic of Kalinga mythology; slayed numerous powerful beings and is celebrated in various Kalinga occasions such as Bodong peace pacts
 Urang Kaya Hadjiyula – a freedom-loving hero of Jolo recorded in the Parang Sabil (Sword of Honor) epic of Tausūg mythology; his life and journey in all facets glorifies the Tausūg's love for freedom, dignity, and honor seen in the tradition of kamaruan
 Maharadia Lawana – a monkey-king recorded in the Maharadia Lawana epic of Maranao mythology who is gifted by the supreme deity with immortality; scholars have noted that the epic is the localized version of the Indian epic Ramayana
 Suac – a cunning hunter-hero from Kapampangan mythology, who defeated various monsters and later became a ruler; has two loyal friends, namely Sunga and Sacu
 Kawlan – a shaman hero of Sumlog from Kalagan mythology; he has the power to communicate with spirits, heal the sick, and see the souls of the dead
 Biuag and Malana– two rival heroes of the Ibanag, the Itawit, and the Gaddang people of Cagayan Valley; they are endowed with supernatural strength by the goddess Maginganay; one version states that the two rivals eventually became friends and did various journeys and defeated many invaders which made all their people proud of them for generations,

Other human figures in Philippine mythology 
Aside from the deities and heroes, numerous human figures, either full humans or demigods which may be mortals or immortals, in Anitism have been attributed as causers or helpers of various events in epics and poems, and their actions supplement some explanations on why things have become to what they are today. A few of these figures are:
 Esa’ – the ancestor of Palawan's Batak people; he named the Kabatakan it Tanabag (Batak Ancestral Lands), after he followed his dog companions during a hunt for wild pigs; the landscape is said to have been created by the movement of Esa’
 Tuglibong – a Bagobo grandmother who persuaded the sky to go up to where it is now by ranting and rebuking it repeatedly
 Bugbung Humasanun – a binukot (well-kept maiden) of great beauty from Bohol who tasked her suitor, Datu Sumanga, to make several mangayaw raids from the southern frontiers such as Jolo and as far north as China; by tradition, she received each time the spoils and captives that Datu Sumanga obtained from the raids
 Ukinirot – a heavenly Bisaya hunter who shot an arrow in the sky, thus making a hole which the sky beings used as an easy entrance to the human world; the hole eventually got blocked by a huge woman who tried to enter the hole
 Sural – the first Bikolano to have thought of a syllabary or suyat script; he carved it on a white rock-slab from Libong, which Gapon later polished
 Timungan – a Kankanaey gardener who created a hole in the skyworld after digging up a gigantic sweet potato in his heavenly garden
 Apolinatu – an Itneg mortal who was fetched by his lover, the star goddess Gagayoma, to live with her in the upper world; the couple had a child named Takyayen, who sprang after Apolinatu pricked Gagayoma's last two fingers
 Dinahong – the original Bikolano potter who was believed to have been an Agta (Negrito) or pygmy; helped the people learn cooking, making pots called coron, stoves, earthen jars, and other kitchen utensils
 Manggat and Sayum-ay – the first man and woman in Buhid Mangyan mythology; gave the name of all trees, animals, lakes, rocks, and spirits found within the Buhid Mangyan ancestral home
 Pandaguan – there are two Bisaya stories regarding Pandaguan, where the tales may be referring to two different persons with the same name; the first Pandaguan was the youngest son of the first man, Sikala, and first woman, Sikabay; he invented a fish trap which caught a gigantic shark; he was later lightly zapped by Kaptan after he boasted that he can defeat the deities; the second Pandaguan was a good and noble man who became a comrade of the deities, but later chose to leave his gifted immortality behind due to the reasoning that both mortals and immortals will always be afflicted with anger and sorrow no matter how short or long they live
 Puhak – a much-hated Manobo man who defecated on the divine stairs created by the deities to connect the mortals with the upper world; due to his mockery, the stairs were permanently closed by the deities
 Dayang Kalangitan – a legendary queen from Tondo who co-ruled initially with her husband, and later as sole ruler of her domain; fragmented Tagalog oral literature maintains that she is currently the only known legendary female monarch from a Tondo dynasty
 Madlawe – a Subanen prince, in the Guman epic, who saved a kingdom called Pagkatolongan; he died in battle but was revived by the maiden Pagl'lokon
 Sawalon – daughter of Padsilung ha Kabatlaw, enemy of Agyu; she successfully poisoned the hero Agyu of the epic Olaging and Ulahingan, however, failed as Agyu was revived later on
 Tomitib Manaon – a dear friend of the Subenen hero Taake; he perished after a battle with Walo Sebang and was revived after Taake's wife and sister "fished back" his soul from a tonawan (pot of melted iron)
 Mabaning and Mabanale – two close friends of the Maranao hero Bantugen; after finding that Bantugan has died, they rode their shields up to the skyworld and retrieved the soul of Bantugen, thus reviving him
 Gat Pangil – a legendary ruler in Tagalog beliefs; said to have established the domains of Bai, Pangil, Pakil, and Mauban
 Kalantiaw – a ruler from Panay who also had influence in west Negros; enacted the Code of Kalantiaw to maintain order among his people; nationally known as a historical figure until Christian scholars from a Roman Catholic university debunked his existence as "mythical" and "an urban legend" in 1968; despite this, various ethnic groups in Western Visayas, where his story originated from, continue to see him as a historical figure
 Bulang – a Buhid Mangyan man who was washed away by torrential rain; he submerged after his foot got stuck, and his body later transformed into a rock now called Bato Bulang found today in the Binagaw river; stories say that if the rock is lifted, the entire area around it will be submerged in water
 Lukbang, Mengedan and Bodek – the three ancestors of the Tagakaolo people; Bodek, the only woman, gave birth to Linkanan and Lampagan, who in turn became parents to two birds, Kalau and Sabitan, who flew away and brought back soil which their parents shaped to form the earth
 Ubing-ubing – the son of greedy parents, Apo Lakay-lakay and Apo Baket-baket; turned into stone by the beach; his parents also turned into stone when the sea touched their feet; the greedy pair's stones can be seen at Taggat Lagoon, while Ubing-ubing's stone is at Sentinela beach in Claveria, Cagayan
 Aguingay – a legendary lady recorded in the epic, Si Bulusan nan Si Aguingay, from Sorsogon beliefs; Mount Bulusan is said to be the burial ground of Aguingay and her lover Bulusan, while some stories say that their burials are the two lakes of the mountain
 Rosa – a mortal woman who was pursued by a son of the sun god in Bikolano mythology; the son refused to light the world until his father consented to his marriage; forgetting to remove his powers of fire, the son accidentally set ablaze Rosa and her entire village when the son visited her; the only thing that remained were hot springs
 Bayani – a mortal who courted the Tagalog goddess, Sinukan; Sinukan tasked him to build a bridge, but he was unable to complete it; Sinukan, in her wrath, transformed a stream into a flash-flood which engulfed the unfinished bridge and Bayani
 Magat – a mortal man who saved a maiden from a huge python; made a promise to the maiden and the deity Kabunian, but failed; the maiden became a dead crocodile and after burying his supposed-to-be wife, he drowned himself in a stream which was then transformed into the Magat River
 Old man of Kagawran – an old kind man from Itbayat who brought the dead bodies of snakes that have been killed by the sun's heat below shades; once when he fell and couldn't get up, a snake with leaves in its mouth slithered beside him and put the leaves on his forehead, healing him instantly and giving him strength; the place where the man fell has since been called as Duch’narbaan (where someone fell)
 Ilang and Edo – lovers from Tayabas with a tragic story; upon learning of Ilang's relationship with Edo, a poor kaingin man, her parents forbade her to see him again and forced her to be with her rich suitors; Ilang refused her parents and chose to wither away and be buried in her lover's meeting place; when she died, the ilang-ilang grew on her burial, which Edo tended for the rest of his remaining life

Other monster figures and familiars in Philippine mythology 

There are also specific figures in Anitism which are not humans. Many of which are monsters from epics and poems, while others are deities, demigods, or humans that turned into non-human forms due to a variety of causes or are originally non-human in form. There are also beings that are essentially non-human messengers, divine familiars, or folkloric animal humanoids. A few of these figures are:
 Bacobaco – a great "sea turtle" who bore into the top of Pinatubo, creating a great crater and emitting great flames, huge rocks, mud, ashes, smoke and deafening noise in the process; stories say that if Bacobaco comes out of the volcano, horrible things will happen
 Kurita – an amphibious animal with several limbs who survived on land and sea and lives at Mount Kabalalan from Maguindanao mythology; eats humans and exterminates all animal life near it
 Kasili – a fish-like snake being who wraps itself around the world; Eugpamolak Manobo, also called Manama and Kalayagan, the supreme deity of the Bagobo people, gave life to Kasili during the world's creation
 Dogong – a gigantic creature that looks like a mermaid with a human head and body of a sea cow but much larger and lives in the coast of Iloilo; guards a large sacred bivalve (‘’taklobo’’) with a shining pearl that night mariners mistake for a light house, causing them to drown
 Kayumang – a giant crab that sometimes bites the giant eel, Kasili, causing Kasili to wriggle and produce earthquakes from Bagobo beliefs; there is also a similar crab named Kagang who does that same to a different earthquake-producing eel
 Tarabusar – a humungous human-like creature who lived in Mount Matutum according to Maguindanaoan beliefs
 Rabot – a ferocious half-human half-monster that could magically turn people into rock; slew by the Bicolano epic hero Bantong using his bolo
 Bakunawa – a dragon-like serpent being present in various distinct mythologies; a beautiful sea goddess who turned into a serpent deity after her love was spurned in Bicolano, and Panay mythologies, while in Bisaya mythology, she played and swallowed six of the seven moons, leaving only one in the end; in one myth, Bakunawa is said to have swallowed most of the moons in anger because her sister, an ancient sea turtle, was killed by humans; another myth states that Bakunawa fell in love with a village girl and swallowed the moon in anger because the village chief burned the girl's house
 Pah – a bird of prey as big as a house in Maguindanaon beliefs; it spreads its wings to cause darkness on the ground; lived at Mount Bita and the eastern parts of Lanao
 Minokawa - a gigantic dragon-like bird according in a Bagobo tale. It has a beak of steel and his claws too are of steel. His eyes are mirrors, and each single feather is a sharp sword. It lives in outer space which can devour the sun and the moon, and would try to do the same with the earth.
 Pilandok – a mischievous, cunning, and trickster human-standing chevrotain in Molbog beliefs, who is sometimes helpful; a different Pilandok is present in Maranao beliefs; the Maranao Pilandok is not a humanoid creature, but a human who was also a cunning and mischievous trickster
 Lakivot – a huge talking civet who can carry a person on his back; defeated the one-eyed ogassi monsters and the garden-protecting busaw in search for the "flower of gold"; transformed into a handsome young man upon the shaving of his civet eyebrow
 Oryol – a Bicolano demigod naga, daughter of the evil god Asuang; fought the hero Handyong in an epic war, which ended with the two becoming lovers due to mutual respect for each other's capabilities; aided Handyong in defeating a race of wicked giant crocodiles that plagued ancient Ibalon
 Limokan – the bird familiar of the Manuvu god Manama; took fertile soil from the maligned god Ogassi; in Mandaya beliefs, a different human-speaking bird with the same name is said to have laid two eggs which hatched the first man and woman; the first egg was laid at the mouth of river Mayo, where the woman was hatched, while the other was laid near the source of the river
 Sinogo – one of the three winged giant messengers (the other two being Dalagan and Guidala) of the Bisaya supreme god, Kaptan, and the favorite of the god due to his handsome face; stole Kaptan's magic shell and was later imprisoned in modern-day Tañon Strait; due to Kaptan's love for him, Sinogo retained a crocodile avatar, a sacred form in old Bisaya beliefs
 Tarabusaw – a huge centaur-like monster who terrorized and force-ruled the people of mainland Mindanao in Maguindanaoan beliefs; slayed by the epic hero Skander
 Olimaw – a gigantic winged phantom dragon-serpent from Ilokano mythology; seeks to swallow the moon
 Omaka-an and Maka-ogis – two dragons who terrorized the people and were slayed by the epic hero Indara Patra (Indarapatra); Omaka-an established lairs in Gurayen mountain range, Makaturing range, and Mount Matutum, where Omaka-an was finally slayed; Maka-ogis was slayed at Gurayen; there story has been heavily Islamized, although many names mentioned retained indigenous qualities
 Sawa – a huge serpent monster from Tagalog and Ati mythologies; attempts to swallow the moon
 Samal Naga – a gigantic trapped dragon in the milky way; will be freed and devour all those not faithful to their respective deities in Samal mythology
 Mampak – a giant raptor from Sorsogon which was slayed through the cooperation of heroes Bulusan and Casiguran; the bird's death and the proposal of Casiguran to Aguingay, who was to be wed to Bulusan, later caused a dispute between the two sides, leading to war, with Bulusan being named the victor
 Gaki – a gigantic crab that is said to be the causer of earthquakes in Bontoc beliefs; authorized by the god Lumawig as his overseer; can cause the earth to flood
 Pangantucan stallion – a wise white horse who saved the domain of Pangantucan from a massacre by uprooting a bamboo and alerting the tribesmen of the enemy's approach.
 Sibbaranguyan – a kind giantess who sheltered, fed, and aided a lost Isnag man; she hid the man from her husband who she thought may eat him; she afterwards told the man the direction to his home
 Inlabbuut – a monster that can shapeshift into a handsome youth to trick people from Ifugao mythology
 First Ilokano owl – a mother who kept on calling out for her dead son and was later transformed into the first owl in Ilokano mythology
 Panigotlo – a loyal deer-like messenger and pet of the Aklanon supreme god Gamhanan; alerted the people due to either an incoming disaster or a prosperous future; killed by a lowly hunter named Dagasanan
 Galura – a gigantic bird in Higaonon beliefs which holds the sky using its talons; its huge wings causes strong winds which acts as buffer to the mortal world a different bird with the same name is present in Kapampangan mythology, where Galura is the winged assistant of the god, Aring Sinukuan, and he is represented by a giant eagle and believed to be the bringer of storms
 Intumbangel – two intertwined male and female snakes who cause earthquakes when they move, winds when they breathe, and violent storms when they pant in Bukidnon myths a similar creature is present in Manobo beliefs, but the Manobo snake is said to "guard" the pillar supporting the world
 Sama Stingray – a gigantic stingray which pulled down the first family of the Sama peoples; when the family re-emerged from the sea, they were filled with vigor and all the traditional knowledge known to the ethnic Sama-Dilaut/Bajau
 Lobo – a large dog which guards the entrance to the underworld in Ilokano mythology; the real indigenous name of Lobo has been lost in time due to Spanish colonization
 Mandaya primordial eel – a gigantic eel where the earth is believed to sat upon; earthquakes are associated with the eel being agitated by crabs and small animals
 Walo – an eight-headed hairy giant with a thousand eyes and guards a section of heaven where the jarred souls of all humans are located in Maranao beliefs
 Gisurab – a fire-possessing giant from Isneg mythology
 Nanreben – a sea serpent from Negros; similar to the Mameleu, it has eyes like blazing torches and horns similar to water buffalo; has long tusk and teeth and highly resistant scales
 Kalapao and Berberoca – giants who can change size at will and can be slain through mortal means in Isneg mythology
 Patakoda – a gigantic omen stallion which used to appear at the Pulangi River; its appearances brought misfortune and calamities upon the local people
 Sulod primordial earthworm – an earthworm caught by the primordial giant Bayi in Sulodnon mythology; the earthworm excreted the earth which became the home of a variety of wild animals, and later, humans
 Kaunting – a magical horse who can be as small as a mouse when not ridden and who can be kept in a box; owned by Cumucul, the eldest son of the Tboli supreme couple deities, Kedaw La Sambad and Bulon La Mogoaw
 Batak crab – a titanic crab in the beliefs of the Batak of Palawan; floods are said to be caused when the crab goes in and out from a huge hole in the sea
 Tandayag – a huge being from Batak mythology in Palawan; different accounts say that the Tandayag is a whale, a giant fish, or a dragon which closes the navel of the world called Burungan; if Burungan is left open and Tandayag is not appeased, the whole universe will be washed away by a furious rush of water, unless a shaman makes a spiritual journey to Burungan to close the navel with the aid of a spirit guide in the form of a sea turtle
 Makarallig – a giant monster created by the evil Manobo god, Ogassi (not the ogassi race from Bagobo beliefs); virtually invulnerable to any weapons and its heart is made from stone; its body became a mass of leeches after being defeated by the Manobo hero Batooy
 Child of Makarallig – the stone child of Makarallig in the form of a human; said to be fastened on a cliff of the Pulangi River and is nurtured by Busaw; if released, the child is said to take on the mantle of his father and destroy all the people of the earth
 Manaul – in Tagalog mythology, some accounts say that it was Manaul who pecked the bamboo where the first humans sprang from, while in some accounts, the bird was Amihan, deity of peace; in Bisaya mythology, a different bird with the same name was the horrible king of the birds who fought the wind deity Tubluck Laui; the epic war ended when Manaul was pummeled with boulders by the Bisaya supreme god, Kaptan; in another Bisaya version, Manaul was the bird who dropped rocks over the deities Kaptan and Maguayan to stop the two from warring; in the mythologies of Panay, a race of birds known as manaul are considered sacred and killing one is punishable by death

Mythological races 
Accedes March 20, 1995

Published on September 16, 2019,
Among the mythical creatures of Philippine mythology are as follows:
 angongolood – a race of swamp gorilla-like beings who jump and hug victims, which are transformed into trees from Bicol beliefs; spooked by noises made by striking the side of boats
 tamahaling – a race of red-skinned earth spirits which may turn maleficent and live in balete trees; they are the keepers of animals in Bagobo mythology; all of them are said to be female
 mahomanay – a race of fair-skinned handsome spirits who are beneficent to nature from Bagobo beliefs; caretakers of animals and live in balete trees; all of them are said to be male
 malawan – a race of spirits who live in springs within deep forests in Buhid Mangyan beliefs
 taw gubat – a race of jungle men who live in the deep forests of central Mindoro according to Buhid Mangyan beliefs
 bulaw – a race of beings who live in mountain peaks in Buhid Mangyan beliefs; fly from one peak to another and lights the path with a torch made of human bone; their race name literally means 'shooting star'
 thalon – a race of obscure dog-like beings with human feet living in Zamboanga Del Sur; the males, called mhenamed thalon, of the race are simple trickster spirits, while the females, called thamad thalon, are terrible man-eating beasts
 santelmo – a race of fireball creatures originating from Visayan and Tagalog mythologies; the term 'santelmo' was adopted from the Spanish although indigenous names of the creatures are known in various ethnic mythologies; called mangalayo by the Suludnon people and allawig by the Ilokano; in Iloilo, it is believed that santelmos are slowly created, in essence, when sunlight hits freshly spilled blood
 manananggal – a race from Bicolano beliefs, similar to the manananggal, but instead of a segmented body by the torso, the body is segmented from the neck, where it leaves its body on the ground while the head and its internal organs fly in seek for food at night
 abat and awok – two similar races in Waray beliefs that are segmenting like the manananggal, but instead of segmenting from the torso, they can fly with their head and hands
 boroko – a race of winged segmenting beings from Ilokano beliefs similar to the manananggal, but the boroka may abduct young humans and keep them as housekeepers, feeding the humans with flesh and liver; can transform into a bird
 caranget – a race of dwarves or earth spirits that can turn into four forms; one of these forms is the siloit, which produces as whizzing sound
 omayan – a race of rice field-inhabiting dwarves in Mandaya beliefs
 aghoy – a race of fair-haired and handsome beings that resemble twenty-year old well-built humans in Waray beliefs; they are friendly to people and will guide those who are looking for something lost
 annani – a race of unfriendly beings in Ibanag beliefs who, when offended, must be offered with a fat hog, uncooked carabao head, rice cakes, coconut milk, sugar, bibingka, basi wines, cigars, and a fee of a dozen betel nuts
 karibang – a race of short, plump, and long-haired earth spirits living in the second layer of the earth in Maranao beliefs; possesses magical powers and are generally invisible to mankind
 amalanhig – a race of walking corpses; a dead person can turn into an amalanhig (or amaeanhig) if its body is not claimed by a family member; during colonization, the Spanish weaponized the belief on amalanhig, falsely claiming that an un-baptized person will turn into an amalanhig
 gakit – a race of sacred ducks which saved a divine woman who fell from the sky; the sacred gakits later landed the woman on Bohol, where she became the ancestor of Boholanos
 marukos – a race of crossroads demons in Ilocano mythology, known for waylaying large travelling groups and causing them to be lost until the entire group is drowned by flashfloods. Particularly associated with the etymological legends of Rosario, La Union.
 umalagad – a race of sacred luck snakes which were carried by various ethnic groups in the Visayas whenever they went into a sea voyage
 sagay – a race of dwarves from Surigao who lives in gold mines; they exchange their gold for chicken blood and they sometimes steal children at night
 idaemonon – a race of earth spirits from Aklanon beliefs who have long fingers which they use to poke the earth from underground every 6 in the morning and the afternoon; stepping on their poking finger will lead to sickness
 kibaan – a race of small creatures with gold teeth and backward feet; live in bangar trees (steroulia foetida) in Ilokano beliefs; they love singing in small groups and strumming guitar-like instruments
 wakwak – a race of beings from Surigao who feeds on fetus and drools at the sight of a pregnant woman
 silagan – a race of beings from Catanduanes who attack white cloth-wearing people; tear out a person's liver and eat it and tears the entrails through the anus
 balbal – a race in Tagbanua belief which can sail through the air like a flying squirrel; has curved nails and a long tongue which it uses to lick and eat a corpse like a dog
 danag – a race of blood-drinking human-like beings from Isneg beliefs
 awan-ulo-na – a race of headless humanoid being from Ilokano beliefs; has a neck-stump which bubbles and froths while it is dancing; a shapeshifter who lives in trees
 binangunan/binangenang – a race of horses in Dumagat beliefs with fire on its back from head to tail; lives in balete trees and bring danger, sickness, and death; old stories say that they may be sighted in Mount Pinatubo
 tulung/tuwing – a race of horse-like beings who have clawed feet, long hair, and large testicles; lives in Mount Pinatubo according to Sambal and Aeta beliefs
 bawa – a race of centaur-like beings from Aklanon beliefs; attracted to ueang (freshwater shrimp); stalks people but stops if the person crosses a river or stream
 tinakchi – a race of mysterious and highly respected mountain-dwelling nature beings from Kalinga mythology; they are known as the "people who can't be seen" and live in the sacred Mount Kechangon of Lubuagan; the powers of the tinakchi are mysterious even for the Kalinga people; some accounts tell that the sacred beings can use teleportation and invisibility at will
 tulayhang – mud crab-like creatures from Suludnon beliefs; disturbing them will causes illnesses
 mambubuno – a race of mermaids with two fish tails instead of one; said to live within the waters of Zambales
 kaperosa – female ghosts who wear flowing white robes or gowns originating from Tagalog beliefs; called amang in Ilokano beliefs
 nuno sa punso – a race of dwarves living in termite mounds in various myths; inflict sickness to people who destroy or damage its home, loves playing the siklot and sungka; a similar creature in Ilokano mythology is the lakay
 lewenri – a race of handsome and music-loving people who appear to boys and girls by moonlight in Romblon beliefs
 mansalauan – a race of birds the size of an exceedingly large bat from Cebu; has red jewel-like eyes, a lizard-like head, a tail covered with long hair, large wings, a sharp tongue, feet like those of a man, and hands like those of a monkey
 popo – a race of tall and slender beings who snorts a lot; Bicolano beliefs tells that their eyes can drain the energy of people, causing pain and even death
 dawendi – a race of height-shifting and night-dwelling beings from Leyte; its height depends on the tree or building it inhabits
 bannog – a race of gigantic birds from Tinguian, Isneg, and Ilokano mythologies; lives in huge trees or cliffsides; can darken the night when they fly overhead
 tigayones – a race of enchanted beings who live in Tigayon Hill in Aklan; used to aid mankind by lending things made of gold; stopped aiding mankind when the things they lent were not returned
 agta – a race of black beings in Eastern Visayas; twice as tall as a normal human, they live in santol trees, mangroves, and swampy places; loves to smoke
 ungo and bawo – two races from the Visayas that are similar to the kapre; muscular men in loincloth who punish people by giving one big latik on the head or stealing the victim's firewood or basket of clothes; loves to smoke with large pipes
 uko – a race of black creatures from Aklanon beliefs; has thick lips that are inside out and lives in guava trees
 tiyanak/Toyol – a race of playful and sometimes deadly monster babies or children originating from Tagalog and many other mythologies, called as patianak among the Mandayas, and muntianak among the Bagobos
 triburon – monster sharks or rays with wings used for flying in the sky; in Bicolano mythology, the triburons were tamed by the epic hero Handyong
 mangalok – a race of beings from Iloilo who targets the liver of the dead; they magically exchange a corpse with a banana stalk; perches on top of a victim's coffin while bearers are carrying it; laughs invisibly while nibbling on the victim's liver
 biraddali – a race of angels "with the glowing beauty of a rainbow" in Tausug and Samal mythologies
 higante – a bracket term adopted from the Spanish, which literally means 'giant'; a few of the races under this bracket term are the kapre, ikugan, and bungisngis
 sirena – a bracket term for various merfolk races in the Philippines with fish-like lower bodies; old stories say that mermaids in the Philippines usually have familiars in the form of golden centipedes; a few of the races under this bracket term are the mambubuno, magindara, and ugkoy

Mythological items 

All ethnic groups in the Philippines have a variety of known mythical objects present in their oral literature, notably in their epics and stories concerning the deities, heroes, and mythical creatures. Some examples of these mythological items are as follow:
 Jaru Pakal – name of a sentient kris with "a mind of its own" and can target foes even without the presence of a wielder; used by the epic brother-heroes of the Maranao people, Indarapatra and Sulayman
 K’lung and K’filan – name of weapons used by the epic hero of the Tboli people, Tud Bulu of Linay Mogul; K’lung is an extremely sturdy wooden shield, while K’filan is a bolo sword which can extend to one million lakes and seas, capable of slashing an entire army with ease
 Sarimbar/Salimbal – name of a huge golden ship "which can accommodate an entire tribe" and fly in the sky; the ship is owned by the epic hero, Agyu, who is recorded in the Ulaging epic and the Ulahingan epic
 aswang black chick – strange black chicks used by the aswang race to pass-on their powers on a descendant
 kibaan powder – strange mystic powders possessed by the kibaan race that will cause skin disease or other malady
 mutya – small jewels that drops from the heart of the banana tree during a full moon or during the midnight of Good Friday; give its wielder mystique powers such as strength, invisibility, and youth rejuvenation
 birang of Laon – a large head-cloth which can provide anything the wielder wants; belonged to King Laon of Negros
 tikbalang hair – locks of golden hair naturally present among members of the tikbalang race; getting the lock will make a tikbalang loyal to the wielder
 biringan black rice – mystique black rice found only in the mythical Biringan city; offered by the biringanon to guests; if a guest eats it, he or she will be unable to leave Biringan for all of eternity
 Golden Shell of Kaptan – the supreme god of the Bisaya people, Kaptan, has a magic golden shell which allows its user to transform to whatever or whoever he or she wants to be; the shell was intended as a gift to Maguayen, goddess of the sea, but the god Sinogo stole it before it was properly delivered; Sinogo was later captured by Kaptan and imprisoned as a crocodile
 monsala – magical flying scarves recorded in the Sondayo epic of Subenen mythology; at least three scarves were known in the epic, one of which was used by Sondayo, the Subanen's main epic hero
 Takalub – the source of traditional authority in Bukid beliefs; there are two kinds, the first is the Gilling (sacred black stick), and the second is the Baklaw (sacred bracelet made of two boar tusks); the Takalub were given by the hero Agyu to his child, Tuluyan; a person who has the Takalub will have kalaki (talent and power) to settle disputes, and good people will become a linibung (immortal)

Status, recognition, protection, and promotion 

At least two oral literature in the Philippines, the Hudhud and the Darangen, and one indigenous game, Punnuk, have been inscribed in the UNESCO Intangible Cultural Heritage Lists. Additionally, four Philippine paleographs (still used by the Hanunoo Mangyan, Buhid Mangyan, Tagbanwa, and Palaw'an peoples), with the inclusion of Ambahan poetry, have been inscribed in the UNESCO Memory of the World Register, under a single entry. The José Maceda Collection inscribed in the Memory of the World Register also contains an array of traditional music from the Philippines containing stories from ethnic mythologies.

In 2014, the international astronomical monitoring agency MPC named asteroid 1982 XB as 3757 Anagolay, after the Tagalog goddess of lost things, Anagolay.

In accordance to the National Cultural Heritage Act, as enacted in 2010, the Philippine Registry of Cultural Property (PReCUP) was established as the national registry of the Philippine Government used to consolidate in one record all cultural property that are deemed important to the cultural heritage, tangible and intangible, of the Philippines. The registry safeguards a variety of Philippine heritage elements, including oral literature, music, dances, ethnographic materials, and sacred grounds, among many others. The National Integrated Protected Areas System (NIPAS) Law, as enacted in 1992 and expanded in 2018, also protects certain Anitist sacred grounds in the country.

Philippine mythology is seldom taught in Filipino schools, even after the implementation of the K-12 educational system. Most mythologies currently taught and approved by the Department of Education and the Commission on Higher Education are composed of Western mythologies, such as Greek, Roman, and Norse. Most entities that promote Philippine mythology for education are artists, scholars, television networks, publishers, and non-profit organizations. Certain stories from Anitism, notably the mythical creatures, have also been promoted globally in international book bazaars, films, art galleries, online games, and educational courses. Both the National Commission for Culture and the Arts (NCCA) and the Cultural Center of the Philippines (CCP) have supported the promotion of Philippine mythology in many occasions, although government funding is still extremely minimal.

See also 
 Dambana
 Indigenous Philippine folk religions
 Philippine literature
 Philippine folk literature
 Philippine mythical creatures
 Philippine witches
 Souls in Filipino cultures

References

Sources 
 Barangay-Sixteenth Century Philippine Culture and Society by William Henry Scott
 Philippine Folklore Stories by John Maurice Miller

External links 

 Philippine Folk Tales by Mabel Cook Cole (1916)
 Filipino Popular Tales by Dean S. Fansler (1921)
 Philippine Folklore Stories by John Maurice Miller (1904)
 Image of Malakas and Maganda by Nestor Redondo from Men, Maiden and Myths, Shanes and Shanes (1979), Art Gallery at alanguilan.com

 
Philippine legendary creatures
Philippine culture